Arnulfo V. Valles (born 15 August 1940) is a Filipino sprinter. He competed in the men's 100 metres at the 1964 Summer Olympics.

References

1940 births
Living people
Athletes (track and field) at the 1964 Summer Olympics
Filipino male sprinters
Olympic track and field athletes of the Philippines
Place of birth missing (living people)
Asian Games medalists in athletics (track and field)
Asian Games bronze medalists for the Philippines
Athletes (track and field) at the 1966 Asian Games
Medalists at the 1966 Asian Games